2011 NASCAR Stock V6 Series was the support series for the NASCAR Corona Series. This season was the first with the name Stock V6. The season was raced only in ovals.

Resume

The season began in the Autódromo Potosino. Rubén García, Jr., son of the driver Rubén García Novoa, won the first event. In the second race, Raúl Galván Jr. take the victory. Meanwhile, Rubén García, Jr. won the championship.

Drivers

2011 calendar

Results

Races

Standings

(key) Bold - Pole position awarded by time. Italics - Pole position set by final practice results or rainout. * – Most laps led.

See also

2011 NASCAR Sprint Cup Series
2011 NASCAR Nationwide Series
2011 NASCAR Camping World Truck Series
2011 NASCAR Canadian Tire Series
2011 NASCAR Corona Series

References

NASCAR Stock V6 Series

NASCAR Mexico Series